The Fox House is a historic house at 1303 South Olive Street in Pine Bluff, Arkansas.  It is a two-story frame structure, its exterior finished in a variety of materials, with a tiled hip roof.  The walls have a typical Craftsman-style variety of materials, including brick, stone, and stuccoed half-timbering.  A gable-roofed entrance portico projects from the front, supported by brick piers and featuring extended eaves and large brackets.  The house was designed by Theodore Sanders and built .

The house was listed on the National Register of Historic Places in 1982.

See also
National Register of Historic Places listings in Jefferson County, Arkansas

References

Houses completed in 1910
Houses in Pine Bluff, Arkansas
Houses on the National Register of Historic Places in Arkansas
National Register of Historic Places in Pine Bluff, Arkansas